Kuhsalar-e Sofla (also Romanized as Kūhsālār-e Soflá; also known as Kūsālār-e Soflá and Kūsālār-e Pā'īn) is a village in Barvanan-e Markazi Rural District, Torkamanchay District, Meyaneh County, East Azerbaijan Province, Iran. At the 2006 census, its population was 108, in 23 families.

References 

Populated places in Meyaneh County